Afroneta is a genus of dwarf spiders that was first described by Å. Holm in 1968.

Species
 it contained twenty-nine species:
Afroneta altivaga Holm, 1968 – Congo
Afroneta annulata Merrett, 2004 – Congo
Afroneta bamilekei Bosmans, 1988 – Cameroon
Afroneta basilewskyi Holm, 1968 – Tanzania
Afroneta blesti Merrett & Russell-Smith, 1996 – Ethiopia
Afroneta elgonensis Merrett, 2004 – Kenya
Afroneta erecta Merrett, 2004 – Congo
Afroneta flavescens Frick & Scharff, 2018 – Kenya
Afroneta fulva Merrett, 2004 – Congo
Afroneta fusca Merrett, 2004 – Congo
Afroneta guttata Holm, 1968 – Congo
Afroneta immaculata Holm, 1968 (type) – Congo
Afroneta immaculoides Merrett, 2004 – Congo
Afroneta lativulva Merrett, 2004 – Congo
Afroneta lobeliae Merrett, 2004 – Congo
Afroneta longipalpis Ledoux & Attié, 2008 – Réunion
Afroneta longispinosa Holm, 1968 – Congo
Afroneta maculata Merrett, 2004 – Congo
Afroneta millidgei Merrett & Russell-Smith, 1996 – Ethiopia
Afroneta pallens Merrett, 2004 – Congo
Afroneta picta Holm, 1968 – Congo
Afroneta praticola Holm, 1968 – Tanzania
Afroneta sarahae Frick & Scharff, 2018 – Kenya
Afroneta serrata Frick & Scharff, 2018 – Kenya
Afroneta snazelli Merrett & Russell-Smith, 1996 – Ethiopia
Afroneta subfusca Holm, 1968 – Congo
Afroneta subfuscoides Merrett, 2004 – Congo
Afroneta tenuivulva Merrett, 2004 – Congo
Afroneta tristis Merrett, 2004 – Congo

See also
 List of Linyphiidae species

References

Araneomorphae genera
Linyphiidae
Spiders of Africa